Andrew Stephen Reynolds (born 21 May 1967) is a Professor of Political Science at the University of North Carolina, USA. Reynolds is a specialist in democratization, electoral system design, constitutional design, minority rights and ethnic conflict. He graduated with a degree in political science from the University of East Anglia in 1989, an MA in South African politics from the University of Cape Town in 1992, and a PhD in Political Science from the University of California, San Diego in 1996. He taught at the University of Notre Dame from 1997–2001 and at Chapel Hill since 2001; between 2008 and 2013 he was the Chair of the Global Studies Curriculum there.

Since 1995 he has undertaken advising missions to over twenty countries and been an expert consultant for half a dozen others. He was an adviser to the Sudan People's Liberation Movement in the Sudan Comprehensive Peace Agreement talks (2003–2005), the Afghan Wolesi Jirga (2003–2007), the Libyan National Transitional Council (2011) and a number of Egyptian political parties (2011). His missions have been sponsored by the United Nations,  the International Institute for Democracy and Electoral Assistance (IDEA), the UK Department for International Development, the US State Department, the National Democratic Institute, the International Republican Institute, the Organization for Security and Cooperation in Europe (OSCE) and the International Foundation for Election Systems.

He has published opinion pieces in the New York Times, Washington Post, and other papers. He also and sits on the editorial board of the academic journal Representation. His work has been translated into multiple languages: French, Spanish, Arabic, Serbo-Croat, Albanian, Burmese, and Portuguese.

His opinion piece in the North Carolina newspaper News and Observer on research from the Electoral Integrity Project, on whose International Advisory Board Reynolds sits, received attention when it declared his home state of North Carolina could "no longer considered to be a fully functioning democracy" with 12 other U.S. states scoring as poorly. Andrew Gelman, a Columbia University statistician, subsequently criticized Reynolds's op-ed and the statistical basis of the EIP's ratings.

Books

References

External links
 

1967 births
Living people
Alumni of the University of East Anglia
University of Cape Town alumni
University of California, San Diego alumni
British political scientists